Pontodoridae is a family of polychaetes belonging to the order Phyllodocida.

Genera:
 Epitoka Treadwell, 1943
 Pontodora Greeff, 1879

References

Phyllodocida